Toq may refer to:

Qualcomm Toq, smartwatch developed by Qualcomm
Toq Temuer (1304–1332), or Tugh Temür, Jayaatu Khan, Emperor Wenzong of the Yuan Dynasty
ISO 639:toq, ISO language code for Toposa language
Barriles Airport, IATA code TOQ
The Occidental Quarterly, American journal